Meriania peltata is a species of plant in the family Melastomataceae. It is endemic to Colombia.

References

peltata
Endangered plants
Endemic flora of Colombia
Taxonomy articles created by Polbot